John Perry (born c. 1950) is a former American football coach.  He served as the head football coach at Lenoir–Rhyne University from 1984 to 1990 and Presbyterian College from 1991 to 1996, compiling a career college football coaching record of 64–79.  Perry played college football at Presbyterian, from which he graduated in 1972.

Head coaching record

References

Year of birth missing (living people)
Living people
Furman Paladins football coaches
Lenoir–Rhyne Bears football coaches
Presbyterian Blue Hose football coaches
Presbyterian Blue Hose football players